Gakuen Tengoku (学園天国, School Heaven) is the fifth single by Japanese pop group Finger 5, released in March 1974. The single sold over 1.05 million copies.

Overview
"Gakuen Tengoku" is the lead single from their studio album Second Album. It peaked at number two on the Oricon Weekly Singles Chart. The theme of the song is school life. The song is about students wanting to sit next to the prettiest girl in class during seating arrangement. In the beginning of the song, the shout "Are You Ready?!" was spoken by Akira Tamamoto, the fourth son of the Tamamoto siblings. The second shout "Hey Hey Hey..." was based on the Gary U.S. Bonds song New Orleans.

In baseball, Konan High School & Akashi Commercial High School used the melody of the song as one of their cheering songs.

In popular culture
The first cover of this song was in 1988, Kyoko Koizumi covered the song in her studio album "Natsumero" and was made into a single in 1989. The single would reach at number three on the Oricon Weekly Singles Chart. It was used as the ending theme for the 1989 Japanese drama series Aishiatteru Kai!. In 2006, a cover by Wonder☆5 was used as the ending theme for the anime Twin Princess of Wonder Planet Gyu!. A musical ensemble of the song was featured in the anime Sound! Euphonium. In 2022, a cover by Rie Takahashi was used as the ending theme for episode six of Teasing Master Takagi-san season three. Around 27 seconds in the credits, the caption "ヤングの祭典" (Young Festival) can be seen on the blackboard which is a direct reference to the caption for the 3rd Tokyo Music Festival (Silver Canary Award category) held on May 16, 1974, at Hibiya Public Hall in which the group also performed and competed live.

Track listing

Chart positions

Weekly charts

Year-end charts

Release history

References

1974 singles
Songs about school